Albert Gunnar Koskinen (29 October 1925 – 23 December 2004) was a Finnish athlete. He competed in the men's high jump at the 1952 Summer Olympics.

References

External links
 

1925 births
2004 deaths
Athletes (track and field) at the 1952 Summer Olympics
Finnish male high jumpers
Olympic athletes of Finland
People from Nokia, Finland
Sportspeople from Pirkanmaa